Aqchehlu (also Romanized as Āqchehlū; also known as Āq Jālū and Aqjehlū) is a village in Shaban Rural District, in the Central District of Meshgin Shahr County, Ardabil Province, Iran. At the 2006 census, its population was 262, in 52 families.

References 

Towns and villages in Meshgin Shahr County